The Texas Woman's Pioneers (also TWU Pioneers) are the athletics teams that represent Texas Woman's University, located in Denton, Texas, in NCAA Division II intercollegiate sports. Even though TWU accepts male students, only female sports are sponsored. The Pioneers compete as members of the Lone Star Conference in basketball, soccer, softball and volleyball, and as an independent in gymnastics. The gymnastics team competes in the Midwest Independent Conference which comprises NCAA Division I, II and III institutions.

Sports sponsored

Softball
As an AIAW Division I team in the 1979 Women's College World Series, the Pioneer softball team won the national championship by defeating UCLA, 1–0, in the deciding game, led by pitcher Kathy Arendsen.

Gymnastics
The TWU Gymnastics squad has won the USA Gymnastics Collegiate National Championships (non-NCAA) with a record 11 team championships since 1993. The most recent championship in 2018.  TWU is the only varsity-level intercollegiate gymnastics program in the state of Texas.

Track and field
TWU won three women's collegiate outdoor track-and-field national championships: in 1969, 1971, and 1973. These included the first (and three of the first five) DGWS/AIAW track-and-field championships ever held.

Volleyball
In 1973, TWU reached the national championship match of the AIAW women's volleyball tournament, only to fall to Long Beach State.

Gallery

Teams

Venues

References

External links